Dhubang is a town and village development committee in Pyuthan, a Middle Hills district of Rapti Zone, western Nepal.

Villages in VDC

References

External links
UN map of VDC boundaries, water features and roads in Pyuthan District

Populated places in Pyuthan District